The Bourbonnais Donkey, is a breed of domestic donkey from the historic region of the Bourbonnais, which corresponds roughly with the modern département of Allier, in the Auvergne region of central France. It was in the past used as a pack animal, for hauling barges, and to pull light gigs. The breed was recognised by the Ministère de l'Agriculture, the French ministry of agriculture, in 2002. The stud book is kept by the Association de l'Ane Bourbonnais, an association of breeders.

History 

The first records of donkeys in the Bourbonnais date from 1862, when there were about 6000; by the beginning of the twentieth century there were 7700. In the 1970s the number had fallen to about 500, and when the Association de l'Ane Bourbonnais was formed in 1994, it identified barely 50. The breed was officially recognised by the agriculture ministry and the Haras Nationaux in October 2002. The stud book for the breed is maintained by the association; almost 200 animals are registered.

Characteristics 

Jacks measure ,  jennies  or up to  more. The coat is chocolate brown, bay or dark bay, with a darker dorsal stripe and shoulder stripe; the legs may show zebra-striping. The lower part of the muzzle is grey-white, as is the belly.

Use 

Like the larger Grand Noir du Berry from slightly further north, the Bourbonnais donkey was used as a pack animal to carry vegetables, coal, milk and the like, and also as a draught animal both for agricultural work and to haul barges on the canals of the region. In the early twentieth century it was also used to pull gigs to transport visitors to the fashionable spa at Vichy. Today it is used as a pack animal for hiking, or for light driving.

References 

Donkey breeds
Donkey breeds originating in France
Allier